Leveson Francis Vernon-Harcourt M.I.C.E. (25 January 1839 – 14 September 1907) was a British civil engineer, author of several treatises on river and harbour engineering.

Biography
Leveson Francis Vernon-Harcourt was the son of Admiral Frederick Edward Vernon-Harcourt (1790–1883), a descendant of the Barons Vernon, and his wife, Marcia Delap née Tollemache (1802–1868). His elder brother was the chemist Augustus George Vernon Harcourt.

He was educated at Windlesham House School, Harrow School and Balliol College, Oxford, graduating in 1861 with a first-class degree in mathematics and natural sciences. He received his training in engineering as a pupil of Sir John Hawkshaw.

In 1870 he married Alice Brandreth, daughter of Lt. Col. Henry Rowland Brandreth FRS, by whom he had four children of which three survived him. His daughter, Evelyn Alice, married the writer Arthur Clutton-Brock in 1903.

He died in 1907 at Swanage.

Work

He specialised in canal and harbour engineering. He was a pioneer in the use of scale models to predict the impact of man made structures in tidal waters, and was an active contributor to the Institution of Civil Engineers, and the author of several books on civil engineering.

His career included acting as resident engineer for an extension to the West India Docks, London under John Hawkshaw, during the 1860s; superintendent of works at Braye Harbour, and construction of a pier at Rosslare. After 1874 he acted as a consultant engineer, and in 1882 was appointed professor of civil engineering at University College London. On his resignation in 1905 he was elected emeritus professor.

Publications

References

Sources

1839 births
1907 deaths
English canal engineers
People educated at Windlesham House School
People educated at Harrow School